Günter Stephan (8 October 1912 – 15 April 1995) was a German footballer who played as a midfielder and made one appearance for the Germany national team.

Career
Stephan earned his first and only cap for Germany on 18 August 1935 in a friendly against Luxembourg. The match, which took place in Luxembourg City, finished as a 1–0 win for Germany.

Personal life
Stephan died on 15 April 1995 at the age of 82.

Career statistics

International

References

External links
 
 
 
 
 

1912 births
1995 deaths
Footballers from Frankfurt
German footballers
Germany international footballers
Association football midfielders
Schwarz-Weiß Essen players
Eintracht Frankfurt players